Pieter Coetze (born 13 May 2004) is a South African swimmer. He is the African record holder in the long course and short course 100 metre backstroke and short course 50 metre backstroke. At the 2022 Commonwealth Games, he won the gold medal in the 100 metre backstroke, the silver medal in the 50 metre backstroke, and the bronze medal in the 200 metre backstroke. At the 2022 World Junior Championships, he competed in ten events, including winning the gold medal in the 200 metre backstroke, silver medals in the 50 metre backstroke, 100 metre backstroke, and the 4×100 metre medley relay, as well as a bronze medal in the 4×100 metre mixed medley relay.

Career
For the 2019 World Junior Championships, held at Danube Arena in Budapest, Hungary in August, Coetze placed ninth in the 50 metre backstroke, tenth in the 4×100 metre medley relay, 15th in the mixed 4×100 metre medley relay, 27th in the 100 metre backstroke, and 29th in the 200 metre backstroke. In the 100 metre backstroke preliminary heats at the 2020 Summer Olympics in Tokyo, Japan, he placed 24th with a time of 54.05 seconds. Later in the year, at the 2021 Swimming World Cup stop in Doha, Qatar in October, and conducted in short course metres, he won gold medals in the 200 metre backstroke with a 1:52.09, in the 50 metre backstroke in a time of 23.13 seconds, in the 100 metre backstroke in 50.86 seconds, placed fifth in the 100 metre individual medley, and placed 12th in the 50 metre butterfly.

2022 South Africa National Championships
At the South Africa National Swimming Championships in April 2022, Coetze swam a time of 53.96 seconds in the 100 metre backstroke in the prelims heats, achieving a qualifying time for both the 2022 Commonwealth Games and 2022 World Aquatics Championships before going on to win the gold medal and national title in the final. He achieved another qualifying time on the third day, this time in the 50 metre backstroke, winning the gold medal with a 24.74. Leading off the 4×50 metre freestyle relay on the fourth day, Coetze secured a qualification time in a third individual event, the 50 metre freestyle, with a time of 22.15 seconds. With a time of 22.34 seconds in the final of the 50 metre freestyle on day five, he won the national title and gold medal in the event, narrowly finishing ahead of Brad Tandy by less than two-tenths of a second. On the sixth and final day of competition, he attained a fourth qualification in a time trial, swimming a 1:56.92 in the 200 metre backstroke. He was named to the World Championships team in the 50 metre backstroke, 100 metre backstroke, and 200 metre backstroke. The following month, he was named to the 2022 Commonwealth Games swim team.

2022 Commonwealth Games
Ranking first in the preliminaries of the 100 metre backstroke on day one of swimming at the 2022 Commonwealth Games, held starting in July in Birmingham, England, Coetze qualified for the semifinals of the event over half a second faster than second-ranked Brodie Williams of England with his time of 53.91 seconds. In the semifinals, he qualified for the final ranking first with a time of 53.67 seconds and was the only swimmer to finish the race in less than 54 seconds out of both semifinal heats. He won the gold medal in the final with a time of 53.78 seconds, marking the second gold medal for South Africa at the 2022 Commonwealth Games. In the preliminaries of the 50 metre backstroke the following morning, he was the only swimmer to achieve a time faster than 25 seconds, finishing in a time of 24.95 seconds and ranking first heading into the semifinals. Later in the same session, he placed sixteenth in the prelims heats of the 100 metre freestyle, qualifying for the semifinals before withdrawing from further competition in the event. He lowered his time by 0.14 seconds in the semifinals of the 50 metre backstroke to a 24.81, ranked first, and qualified for the event's final. In the final, he finished 0.12 seconds behind gold medalist Andrew Jeffcoat of New Zealand with a 24.77 to win the silver medal. Later in the same finals session, he anchored the 4×200 metre freestyle relay with a 1:49.86 to help achieve a sixth-place finish in 7:13.76.

On day five, Coetze ranked fourth in the preliminaries of the 200 metre backstroke, qualifying for the evening final with a time of 1:58.08. In the final, he swam a personal best time of 1:56.77 and won the bronze medal. Later in the session, he swam a personal best time of 53.42 seconds for the backstroke leg of the 4×100 metre mixed medley relay, to help finish fourth in an African record and  South African record time of 3:44.38.

2022 World Junior Championships

On 28 June, Coetze was named to the official South Africa roster for the 2022 FINA World Junior Swimming Championships, held in August and September in Lima, Peru. On the morning of day one, he qualified for the semifinals of the 100 metre backstroke, ranking second with a time of 53.93 seconds in the preliminaries. Later in the prelims session, he led off the 4×100 metre freestyle relay with a personal best time of 49.75 to help qualify the relay to the final ranking seventh. In the evening session, he started by setting an African record, South African record, and Championships record with a personal best time of 52.95 seconds in the semifinals of the 100 metre backstroke to qualify for the final ranking first. For the final of the 4×100 metre freestyle relay, he equalled his lead-off time of 49.75 seconds from the preliminaries, helping achieve a sixth-place finish in 3:24.09. The following morning, in the preliminary heats of the 100 metre butterfly, he was disqualified for a 15 metre mark violation off of his start, that is, kicking underwater further than 15 metres after his dive. For the preliminaries of the 4×100 metre mixed medley relay, he helped advance the relay to the final ranking sixth, splitting a 53.94 for the backstroke leg of the relay and contributing to a time of 4:01.18. Later in the day, he won the silver medal in the 100 metre backstroke with a 52.99 and a bronze medal in the 4×100 metre mixed medley relay, splitting a 53.31 for the backstroke portion and contributing to the final mark of 3:58.58.

As the only competitor under 25 seconds in the preliminaries of the 50 metre backstroke on day three, Coetze qualified for the semifinals ranking first with a time of 24.95 seconds. For his second morning event, he swam a 49.85 for the lead-off leg of the 4×100 metre mixed freestyle relay, helping qualify for the final ranking fourth with a time of 3:36.82. In the evening, he ranked first in the semifinals of the 50 metre backstroke with a personal best time of 24.58 seconds, breaking the former Championships record of 24.63 established in 2017 by Michael Andrew of the United States, and advancing to the final. A little over 45 minutes later, he helped place seventh in the 4×100 metre mixed freestyle relay, leading off with a time of 49.88 to contribute to a final time of 3:37.32. The next day, he ranked fourth in the morning preliminaries of the 50 metre butterfly and qualified for the semifinals with a time of 24.36 seconds. Before the start of the evening session, he withdrew from the 50 metre butterfly; in the session itself, he won the silver medal in the 50 metre backstroke with a time of 24.61 seconds, finishing only behind Ksawery Masiuk of Poland.

In the preliminaries of his eighth event of the Championships, the 100 metre freestyle, on day five, Coetze tied for fourth rank overall with a time of 50.09, which was 1.42 seconds behind first-ranked Diogo Ribeiro of Portugal and qualified him for the semifinals. Before the start of the competition in the semifinals, he withdrew from the event. Starting the sixth and final day in his ninth event, he ranked second in the preliminaries of the 200 metre backstroke behind Hidekazu Takehara of Japan with a 2:01.69 and qualified for the final. Later in the morning, he split a 56.80 for the backstroke leg of the 4×100 metre medley relay, his tenth event, contributing to a time of 3:50.36, which qualified the relay to the final ranking eighth. In the evening final for the 200 metre backstroke, he won the gold medal with a personal best time of 1:56.05, which set a new Championships record in the event, lowering the record over six-tenths of a second from the former mark of 1:56.69 set in 2017 by Hugo González of Spain. Concluding his competition at the Championships, he split a 53.66 for the backstroke leg of the 4×100 metre medley relay in the final to help win the silver medal with a final time of 3:42.95.

2022 World Short Course Championships
For his first event in the morning session on day one of the 2022 World Short Course Championships in Melbourne, Australia, Coetze ranked ninth in the preliminary heats of the 100 metre backstroke with a personal best time of 50.26 seconds and qualified for the semifinals. He finished in an African and South African record time of 49.85 seconds in the semifinals, which qualified him to the final ranking sixth. Improving the African record by 0.25 seconds to 49.60 seconds in the final, he placed fourth. In his first preliminary on day three, for the 50 metre backstroke, he achieved a personal best time of 23.01 seconds and qualified for the semifinals ranking third. In his second preliminary, he anchored the 4×50 metre freestyle relay with a 21.75 to help place twelfth with a time of 1:29.27. Swimming 0.15 seconds faster in the evening semifinals of the 50 metre backstroke, he achieved a new personal best time of 22.86 seconds and qualified for the final ranking fourth overall. The following morning, he placed fortieth in the 50 metre freestyle with a personal best time of 21.68 seconds. On the evening of day four, he set a new African record in the final of the 50 metre backstroke with a personal best time of 22.84 seconds, with which he took fifth place.

Coetze reiterated a sub-23 second performance in the 50 metre backstroke for the lead-off of the 4×50 metre medley relay, swimming the segment in 22.96 seconds to help place fourteenth with a time of 1:37.14. On the final morning of the competition, he placed tenth in the 200 metre backstroke, his sixth event, with a time of 1:51.51.

International championships (50 m)

International championships (25 m)

Personal best times

Long course metres (50 m pool)

Short course metres (25 m pool)

Swimming World Cup circuits
The following medals Coetze has won at Swimming World Cup circuits.

Continental and national records

Long course metres (50 m pool)

Short course metres (25 m pool)

References

External links
 

2004 births
Living people
South African male swimmers
Olympic swimmers of South Africa
Swimmers at the 2020 Summer Olympics
Sportspeople from Pretoria
21st-century South African people
Swimmers at the 2022 Commonwealth Games
Commonwealth Games medallists in swimming
Commonwealth Games gold medallists for South Africa
Commonwealth Games silver medallists for South Africa
Commonwealth Games bronze medallists for South Africa
Medallists at the 2022 Commonwealth Games